Anjneri Dam, is an earthfill dam on Panzara River near Sakri in Nashik district of state of Maharashtra in India.

Specifications

Purpose
 Irrigation

See also
 Dams in Maharashtra
 List of reservoirs and dams in India

References

Dams in Nashik district
Year of establishment missing